Look, Up in the Sky! The Amazing Story of Superman is a 2006 documentary film from executive producers Bryan Singer and Kevin Burns which details the history of the Superman franchise, from comic book, to television, to the big screen. The story of Superman is told through archival footage, as well as interviews with many of the actors, directors, and producers involved with the Superman media over the years. The closing credits feature outtakes from the Christopher Reeve Superman films, including an outtake of Marlon Brando improvising during the recitation of a poem in a scene deleted from the original version of Superman II.

The documentary was released on DVD on June 20, 2006, shortly before the theatrical release of Superman Returns. A two DVD Best Buy exclusive Limited Edition version was released the same day (extra material on the second disc included Bryan Singer's video journals and five official Superman movie poster mini-prints). A shortened version of the documentary was played on A&E on June 12. Finally, the DVD (along with Singer's video journals) was included as part of the 14-disc box set release Superman Ultimate Collector's Edition, in November. In May 2020, the documentary was made available on YouTube on the Warner Bros. Entertainment channel, followed by the DC Comics channel in June.

Cast
Kevin Spacey, who also played Lex Luthor in Superman Returns, narrates the documentary. Bill Mumy and Mark Hamill are also credited as consultants on the documentary. The rest of those appearing are listed below.

Those directly associated with Superman:
Dean Cain (Clark Kent / Superman - Lois & Clark: The New Adventures of Superman)
Gerard Christopher (Clark Kent / Superboy - Superboy)
Jackie Cooper (Perry White - Superman: The Movie, Superman II, Superman III, Superman IV: The Quest for Peace)
Richard Donner (director of Superman: The Movie and Superman II: The Richard Donner Cut)
Alfred Gough and Miles Millar (executive producers and creators of Smallville)
Margot Kidder (Lois Lane - Superman: The Movie, Superman II, Superman III, Superman IV: The Quest for Peace; Bridgette Crosby - Smallville)
Jack Larson (Jimmy Olsen - Adventures of Superman; Old Jimmy Olsen - Lois & Clark: The New Adventures of Superman; Bo the Bartender, Superman Returns)
Bill Mumy (Tommy Puck - Superboy)
Noel Neill (Lois Lane - Adventures of Superman, Superman film serial; Lois Lane's Mother - Superman: The Movie; Gertrude Wanderworth - Superman Returns)
Annette O'Toole (Lana Lang - Superman III; Martha Kent - Smallville)
Brandon Routh (Clark Kent / Superman - Superman Returns)
Ilya Salkind (executive producer of Superman: The Movie, Superman II and Superman III)
Bryan Singer (director of Superman Returns)
Lesley Ann Warren (Lois Lane - It's a Bird...It's a Plane...It's Superman)
Those not directly associated with Superman:
Mark Hamill (did the voice of The Joker in animated incarnations, best known for his role as Luke Skywalker in Star Wars)
Stan Lee (former editor-in-chief at Marvel Comics, and co-creator of characters such as Spider-Man, Hulk and the X-Men)
Gene Simmons (musician and comic book fan)
Adam West (Bruce Wayne / Batman - Batman: The Movie, Batman)

References

External links
Trailer - An extended preview of the film
 
 
Superman Homepage - Review

2006 films
2006 documentary films
Superman films
Documentary films about comics
Films produced by Bryan Singer
2000s English-language films
2000s American films